Halolaguna is a genus of moth in the family Lecithoceridae.

Species
Halolaguna biferrinella (Walker, 1864)
Halolaguna discoidea Teng, Liu & Wang, 2014
Halolaguna flabellata Teng, Liu & Wang, 2014
Halolaguna guizhouensis Wu, 2012
Halolaguna oncopteryx (Wu, 1994)
Halolaguna orthogonia Wu, 2000
Halolaguna palinensis Park, 2000
Halolaguna sanmaru Park, 2011
Halolaguna sublaxata Gozmány, 1978

References

 
Torodorinae
Moth genera
Taxa described in 1978